Sarah Jane Burton  (née Heard; born 1974) is an English fashion designer, currently creative director of fashion brand Alexander McQueen. She designed the wedding dress of Catherine Middleton for her wedding to Prince William in 2011. In 2012, she was named in Time 100, an annual list of the 100 most influential people in the world according to Time.

Early life
Burton was born in Macclesfield, Cheshire, one of five children of Anthony and Diana Heard. She attended Withington Girls' School in Manchester. After completing an art foundation course at Manchester Polytechnic, and opting to pursue fashion over studies in fine art, she studied Print Fashion at the Central Saint Martins College of Art and Design in London. During her third year she was interviewed for a year's placement at Alexander McQueen at the suggestion of her tutor Simon Ungless, a friend of McQueen's. She joined the company for a year as an intern, when the company was based in a tiny studio in Hoxton Square.

Fashion career

On graduation in 1997, she joined the company full-time as McQueen's personal assistant. Burton was appointed Head of Womenswear in 2000, during which time she created dresses for Michelle Obama, Cate Blanchett, Lady Gaga and Gwyneth Paltrow. Following McQueen's death in February 2010, and after company owner Gucci confirmed that the brand would continue, Burton was named as the new creative director of Alexander McQueen in May 2010. In September 2010, Burton presented in Paris the first McQueen womenswear collection she had wholly created.

On 29 April 2011, it was revealed that Burton had designed the wedding dress of Catherine Middleton for her marriage that day to Prince William, Duke of Cambridge. Burton's work came to the attention of Middleton in 2005 when she attended the wedding of Tom Parker Bowles, the son of the Duchess of Cornwall, for whom McQueen had designed the wedding dress for his bride, fashion journalist Sara Buys. Made by the Royal School of Needlework, Burton said creating the royal wedding dress had been the "experience of a lifetime".

Burton also designed maid of honour Pippa Middleton's dress, and the dress that Kate Middleton wore to the wedding's evening festivities.

In 2011, Burton was named the British Fashion Council's Designer of the Year.

Personal life
As of 2011 Burton lived in St John's Wood with her husband David Burton, a fashion photographer.

Honours
On 28 November 2011 Sarah Burton won the Designer of the Year at the 2011 British Fashion Awards.

In July 2012, Burton received an honorary degree from Manchester Metropolitan University where she was a former student, becoming an honorary Doctor of Arts.

Burton was appointed Officer of the Order of the British Empire (OBE) in the 2012 Birthday Honours for services to the British fashion industry.

In June 2019, Burton was awarded the Valentino Garavani and Giancarlo Giammetti International Award by the Council of Fashion Designers of America. In November 2019, the British Fashion Council bestowed Burton with the Trailblazer Award.

References

External links

Alexander McQueen Website

Living people
People from Macclesfield
Alumni of Manchester Metropolitan University
Alumni of Central Saint Martins
English fashion designers
British women fashion designers
1974 births
People educated at Withington Girls' School
Officers of the Order of the British Empire
Wedding dress designers
Alexander McQueen